The Osmaniye class was a group of four ironclad warships built for the Ottoman Navy in the 1860s. They were the first vessels of the type to be built for the Ottoman Empire; all four were built in Great Britain, the first three by Robert Napier and Sons and the fourth by Thames Iron Works. The ships were broadside ironclads, carrying a battery of fourteen  Armstrong guns and ten 36-pounder Armstrong guns in a bank of guns on each broadside.

The ships saw little active service, in part owing to the fact that they were considered too large and thus too valuable to risk during the Russo-Turkish War of 1877–1878. The Ottoman fleet was placed in reserve for the following two decades, during which the four ships of the Osmaniye class were heavily rebuilt into more modern barbette ships. They were in poor condition by the outbreak of the Greco-Turkish War in 1897, like much of the rest of the fleet, and as a result saw no action during the war. The Navy considered rebuilding the ships for the second time in the early 1900s, but abandoned the idea due to their deteriorated state. As a result, the four ships were decommissioned in 1909 and Mahmudiye and Orhaniye were broken up in 1913, with Osmaniye and Aziziye remaining in the Navy's inventory until 1923, when they too were scrapped.

Design
In 1861, Abdülaziz became sultan of the Ottoman Empire, and thereafter began a construction program to strengthen the Ottoman Navy, which had incurred heavy losses during the Crimean War of 1853–1856. The Navy ordered ironclad warships from shipyards in Britain and France, though the program was limited by the Ottoman Empire's limited finances. The Osmaniye class were the first ironclads to be ordered as part of the program.

Characteristics
Their hulls were constructed with iron, incorporated a ram bow, and displaced  normally and  BOM. They had a crew of 26 officers and 335 enlisted men as completed, but only 250 after 1894.

The ships were powered by a single horizontal compound engine which drove one screw propeller. Steam was provided by six coal-fired box boilers that were trunked into a single, retractable funnel amidships. Osmaniye and her sister ships carried  of coal. A supplementary barque rig with three masts was also fitted.

The ships were armed with a battery of one  rifled muzzle-loading (RML) Armstrong gun and fourteen  RML Armstrongs. These were supplemented with ten 36-pounder guns, also manufactured by Armstrong. The 229 mm gun was placed on the upper deck, forward, and the rest of the guns were mounted on each broadside on the upper and main decks.

Modifications
In 1884, the 36-pounder guns were removed and a light battery of four  quick-firing (QF) Hotchkiss guns and two 4-barreled  Nordenfelt guns were added.

All four ships were refitted at the Imperial Arsenal, with work lasting from 1890 to 1894. Their armament was radically revised; all of the old muzzle-loaders were removed and a battery of new Krupp breech-loading guns were installed. Two Krupp  K L/35 guns were added in individual barbettes, one forward and one aft. Eight  L/25 Krupp guns and six  L/25 Krupp guns were installed on the broadside. Two of the 47 mm guns were removed and three more Nordenfelt guns were added.

Ships

Service history

Unlike most of the other ironclads of the Ottoman fleet, the four Osmaniye-class ships were kept out of action during the Russo-Turkish War of 1877–1878, since they were among the largest and most powerful vessels of the fleet and the high command decided they ought to be preserved. As a result, they generally remained safely in the Sea of Marmara, though Osmaniye was briefly used as a troop transport in the Mediterranean Sea. The four ships were reduced to reserve status in Constantinople after the war, with the rest of the Ottoman fleet. The four ships were heavily rebuilt in the early 1890s, being converted into more modern barbette ships. Nevertheless, they were in poor condition by the outbreak of the Greco-Turkish War in February 1897, with many of their guns damaged or incomplete. Training exercises conducted in May highlighted the very low standard of training of their crews, and reinforced the decision not to confront the Greek Navy at sea.

All four ships were disarmed after the war and laid up. The Ottomans began a reconstruction program, which was to have included the four Osmaniye-class ships. The proposed alterations included a new propulsion system and a battery consisting of one 203 mm quick-firing gun and nine 150 mm QF guns. But the ships were found to be not worth rebuilding a second time, and so all were ultimately decommissioned in 1909. Aziziye, Orhaniye, and Mahmudiye were briefly used as barracks ships; the latter two were sold for scrap in 1913, and Aziziye and Osmaniye followed them to the ship breakers in 1923.

Notes

References